FM 100 is a radio station in Pakistan broadcasting in nine cities which include Karachi, Lahore, Islamabad, Hyderabad, Rahim Yar Khan, Gujrat, Jhelum, Abbottabad, and Multan. It was founded on March 23, 1995 and has a listening area covering most urban centres. It was the first commercial radio station in Pakistan, and provided live entertainment programs round the clock in an effort to promote Pakistani music among the population.

Its slogan is “Assalam-o-Alaikum Pakistan” which literally means “May Peace be on Pakistan".

History 
FM 100 was established in the year 1994 and started broadcasting its regular transmission from March 23, 1995. In the early days, it broadcast in three cities (Karachi, Lahore, and Islamabad). In 2012, it expanded its network to include Hyderabad and Rahim Yar Khan, and soon added Gujrat, Jhelum, Abbottabad, and Multan in 2014. As of January 22, it plans to launch stations in Shikarpur, Jacobabad, and Benazirabad soon.

Programming 
Its regular programming includes religious programs, daily five-time prayers, Friday prayer sermon, national and international days coverage, special events coverage, talk shows, youth shows, kids slot, sports roundup, IT-related programs along with the latest Pakistani pop, folk, and film music as well as Western music.

References

Radio stations in Pakistan
1995 establishments in Pakistan